José Arturo Aliaga López (born 12 October 1955) is a Spanish politician from the Aragonese Party (PAR) who serves as the Vice President of the Government of Aragon and Regional Minister of Industry, Competitiveness and Business Development since August 2019. He has been the president of the PAR since June 2015.

References

1955 births
Members of the Cortes of Aragon
Living people